Heinrich Joseph Wassermann (3 April 1791 – 3 September 1838) was a German-Swiss violinist, composer and conductor.

Life and career 
Wassermann was born in Schwarzbach near Fulda, the son of the village musician Johann Wassermann (1757-1815). After he was first taught in 1802 by Michael Henkel in Fulda, he held teaching positions and subsequently played in several spa orchestras. In 1810 he was trained by the violinist Louis Spohr in Gotha. His good testimony earned him a position as chamber musician in the Meiningen Court Orchestra in 1811. From 1820 to 1829 he was 1st violinist at the court chapel in Donaueschingen. This position allowed him to undertake concert and study trips, among others to Darmstadt to the court organist Johann Christian Heinrich Rinck. In 1829 he became music director of the "Société de musique" in Geneva, in the same year he got a job in Basel.

He died in Riehen near Basel at age 47.

Further reading 
 Axel Beer: ''Heinrich Joseph Wassermann (1791–1838): Hamburg-Eisenach, Wagner, 1991, 256 pages. Hamburg 1991.

References

External links 
 
 Wassermann, Heinrich Joseph on Munich University

1791 births
1838 deaths
People from Fulda
19th-century German composers
German Romantic composers
20th-century Swiss composers